Atchafalaya National Heritage Area is a federally designated National Heritage Area encompassing parts of fourteen parishes along the  Atchafalaya River in the U.S. State of Louisiana. The heritage area extends the length of the Atchafalaya Basin from the area of Ferriday in the north to the river's mouth beyond Morgan City. The National Heritage Area is divided into four regions: Upper, Between 2 Rivers, Bayou Teche Corridor and the Coastal Zone. The designation provides a framework for the promotion and interpretation of the area's cultural and historic character, and the preservation of the natural and built environment. The heritage area designation recognizes the area's unique environment and culture, and its contributions to music, English and French language, literature, and cuisine.

Major locales included in the Heritage Area include Avery Island, New Iberia, Morgan City, Lafayette, Opelousas, Baton Rouge, Plaquemine and Houma. Jean Lafitte National Historical Park, Longfellow-Evangeline State Historic Site and Plaquemine Lock State Historic Site are included in the heritage area, as well as the Louisiana State Museum branches in Baton Rouge and Patterson. Parishes partly or wholly included in the area include Concordia, Avoyelles, Pointe Coupee, St. Landry, Lafayette, St. Martin, Iberia, East Baton Rouge, Ascension, West Baton Rouge, Iberville, St. Mary, Assumption and Terrebonne parishes.

The National Heritage Area was authorized by Public Law 109-338, also known as the National Heritage Area Act of 2006.

References

External links
 Atchafalaya National Heritage Area website

 
National Heritage Areas of the United States
Protected areas established in 2006
2006 establishments in Louisiana
Protected areas of Concordia Parish, Louisiana
Protected areas of Avoyelles Parish, Louisiana
Pointe Coupee Parish, Louisiana
St. Landry Parish, Louisiana
Protected areas of Lafayette Parish, Louisiana
Protected areas of St. Martin Parish, Louisiana
Protected areas of Iberia Parish, Louisiana
Protected areas of East Baton Rouge Parish, Louisiana
Ascension Parish, Louisiana
West Baton Rouge Parish, Louisiana
Protected areas of Iberville Parish, Louisiana
Protected areas of St. Mary Parish, Louisiana
Assumption Parish, Louisiana
Protected areas of Terrebonne Parish, Louisiana